Starykoń (Polish for "Old Horse") is a Polish coat of arms. It was used by several szlachta (noble) families under the Polish–Lithuanian Commonwealth. Notable bearers of this coat of arms include Jan Wielopolski.

Sources 
 Dynastic Genealogy

See also
 Polish heraldry
 Heraldry

External links 
  Starykon Coat of Arms and bearers. 
  

Polish coats of arms